Charlton Maxwell Jimerson (born September 22, 1979) is a retired Major League Baseball outfielder.  He played college baseball at the University of Miami.

Early life
Growing up in Hayward, California, Jimerson endured a turbulent childhood. His mother was addicted to crack cocaine, and she often abandoned Charlton and his younger brother Terrence while searching for drugs. His father had moved out and abandoned the family while Jimerson was young, becoming a homeless person, and before that time had been physically abusive of Charlton's mother. The family was supported largely by Jimerson's sister Lanette, who worked as many as three jobs simultaneously to provide financial support. Lanette also helped the oldest of the five children, Derrell, sue for custody of Charlton and Terrence when Charlton was 15.

University of Miami
After Jimerson graduated from Mt. Eden High School, he was chosen by the Astros in the 24th round of the 1997 June draft, with the 760th overall pick. Jimerson did not feel that he was ready for a professional career, however, and he instead chose to attend the University of Miami on an academic scholarship.

Jimerson earned a spot on the University of Miami's baseball team as a walk-on, although he had not been widely recruited in high school. Coach Jim Morris initially tried to convince him to transfer to a junior college, but Jimerson used a homemade portfolio of clippings and a personal essay to impress the coach with his motivation. He was a bench player his first three years, and he did not play during Miami's successful pursuit of the 1999 College World Series title, but an injury to a teammate opened a spot for him in the starting lineup his senior year. In 1999, he played for the Bethesda Big Train, a college wooden bat summer team.  

Jimerson took the opportunity and ran with it, ultimately being honored as the "Most Valuable Player" in the 2001 College World Series, as Miami won its second title in three years. He tied a CWS record by stealing four bases in a game against Tennessee, and his teammates voted him the "Bob Werner Memorial Award", for exhibiting the qualities of a "winner". Jimerson graduated from the University of Miami with a bachelor's degree in computer science, and the Houston Astros again selected him in the draft, this time using the 146th overall pick, part of the fifth round of the 2001 Major League Baseball Draft. This time, Jimerson elected to turn pro.

Professional career

Houston Astros
Jimerson is regarded as having very good physical tools, with some scouts comparing his abilities to those of a young Eric Davis. Baseball America cited him as being the "Best Athlete" and having the "Best Outfield Arm" in Houston's farm system in 2005, and he has stolen more than 25 bases in each of his four years in full-season baseball. He has had trouble maintaining his batting average, however, hitting only .245 through all levels of the minor leagues. He also strikes out frequently, with 152 Ks in 2005 and 163 the season before.

Jimerson made his major league debut on September 14, 2005, appearing as a defensive replacement in a 10–2 win against the Florida Marlins; he did not record an out, nor did he make a plate appearance. He was called up again after the roster expansion at the end of the 2006 season. When he pinch-hit for Roger Clemens in a game against the Philadelphia Phillies on September 4, 2006, he hit a home run in his first major league at-bat. Jimerson was released from the Astros on March 28, 2007, four days after he was outrighted to the Double-A Corpus Christi Hooks.

Seattle Mariners
The Seattle Mariners signed Jimerson to a minor league contract on May 8, 2007, and sent Jimerson to Double-A West Tenn Diamond Jaxx. In his first two months in West Tennessee, Jimerson continued to exhibit a low batting average and a high strikeout rate, but with a notable increase in power. In his first 244 plate appearances, he hit 16 home runs and slugged .552. With the trade of Sebastien Boucher and a player to be named later or cash to the Baltimore Orioles for pitcher John Parrish on August 9, 2007, the Mariners optioned Charlton Jimerson to Triple-A Tacoma. After later spending time on the big league club later that September, Jimerson made the opening day roster for the 2008 season as a backup outfielder. He was designated for assignment on April 11, 2008, to make room for Greg Norton on the active roster. On April 16, 2008, Jimerson was re-signed and assigned to Triple-A Tacoma, but was released in early July.

Independent League
Jimerson signed with the Sioux City Explorers of the American Association on August 5, 2008, but was released from the Explorers 10 days later on August 15, 2008.

Newark Bears 
Jimerson played for the Newark Bears in 2009. He carried a .335 batting average; had 21 home runs; and stole 38 bases for the team.

Minnesota Twins
Jimerson signed a minor league contract with the Minnesota Twins in March 2010 and was assigned to the Rochester Red Wings. He was waived by the organization on April 6 of the same year.

Bridgeport Bluefish
Jimerson's played for the Bridgeport Bluefish of the Atlantic League in 2010. He was all-star selection before leaving to play for Los Angeles Angels' Double-A affiliate, the Arkansas Travelers.

Los Angeles Angels of Anaheim
Jimerson's contract was purchased by the Los Angeles Angels of Anaheim from the Bridgeport Bluefish of the Atlantic League on July 19, 2010. He was assigned to the Angels' Double-A affiliate, the Arkansas Travelers.

Against All Odds: A Success Story
On March 14, 2015, Charlton Jimerson released a memoir titled Against All Odds: A Success Story.  The book is organized into "innings" rather than chapters. In the book he tells the story of his childhood where he was raised in a family of five kids along with a mother who struggled with drug dependency and often suffered drug-related violence. He describes his growing love of baseball, sharing how both school and sports offered him positive ways forward. He also notes the key people and crucial moments in his life that led him to become a major league baseball player where he hit a home run in his first ever at-bat.  The hit was off Cole Hamels and ruined his perfect game.  The book was independently published on Createspace.

Personal life
Jimerson and his wife Candace live in Missouri City, Texas during the offseason with their daughter Carter, and sons Tyson, Nicolas and Caden.  He remains actively working with youth baseball in the Houston/Missouri City area.

His personal website recently launched as a portal to find all things Charlton Jimerson.  The website is: www.charltonjimerson.com

See also
Home run in first Major League at-bat

References

External links
, or Retrosheet, or Baseball Reference (Minor, Fall, Winter and Independent Leagues)

Living people
1979 births
African-American baseball players
Arkansas Travelers players
Baseball players from California
Bridgeport Bluefish players
Cardenales de Lara players
American expatriate baseball players in Venezuela
College World Series Most Outstanding Player Award winners
Corpus Christi Hooks players
Houston Astros players
Lexington Legends players
Major League Baseball center fielders
Miami Hurricanes baseball players
Newark Bears players
People from San Leandro, California
Pittsfield Astros players
Round Rock Express players
Salem Avalanche players
Seattle Mariners players
Sioux City Explorers players
Tacoma Rainiers players
Tomateros de Culiacán players
American expatriate baseball players in Mexico
West Tennessee Diamond Jaxx players
21st-century African-American sportspeople
20th-century African-American sportspeople